Rialto High School is a public high school located in San Bernardino, California that opened in September 1992. It is operated by the Rialto Unified School District, and is a member of the San Andreas. 
The name of the school's student-run newspaper is The Medieval Times. The current principal is Dr. Caroline Sweeney.

List of Rialto High School Principals 1992-Present 
Anna Rodriguez (1992–2003)
Dr. Miguel Elias (2003–05)
Mehran Akhtarkhavari (2005–08)
Andres Luna (2008–2011)
Albert Castillo (2011-2013)
Arnie Ayala (2013–2019)
Dr. Caroline Sweeney (2019-current)

Notable alumni

Lonyae Miller –  NFL running back, Dallas Cowboys #35. Transferred out of Rialto as a junior.
Ryan Grice-Mullen – CFL wide receiver who originally signed with Houston Texans and Chicago Bears as undrafted free agent.  Played for the University of Hawaii, where he earned All-WAC accolades.
Ricky Nolasco – MLB pitcher drafted out of high school now playing with the Arizona Diamondbacks.
Josh Whitesell – MLB first baseman

References

External links
Rialto High School website
Rialto High School Facts Sheet, 2003–2004
Rialto High School Facts Sheet, 2004–2005

Educational institutions established in 1992
High schools in San Bernardino County, California
Public high schools in California
Rialto, California
1992 establishments in California